The Llandoger Trow is a historic public house in Bristol, south-west England. Dating from 1664, it is on King Street, between Welsh Back and Queen Charlotte Street, near the old city centre docks. Named by a sailor who owned the pub after Llandogo in Wales which built trows (flat-bottomed river boats), the building was damaged in World War II, but remained in sufficiently good condition to be designated Grade II* listed building status in 1959. The pub is said to have inspired Robert Louis Stevenson to write of the Admiral Benbow Inn in Treasure Island and  Daniel Defoe supposedly met Alexander Selkirk there, his inspiration for Robinson Crusoe. The pub is also supposedly haunted, with up to 15 ghosts, the best known being a small child whose footsteps can be heard on the top floor.

On 20 April 2019 the pub was closed, but has now re-opened as part of the Bloomsbury Leisure group.

History

The building dates from 1664, originally a row of three houses. It was built on a timber box frame, with brick stacks. The pub has an 18th-century shop front, but the main door dates from the 20th century.  The pub was partially destroyed by a bomb in World War II, but three of the original five projecting gables remain. It was designated a Grade II* listed building on 8 January 1959.

Tradition has it that Daniel Defoe met Alexander Selkirk, his inspiration for Robinson Crusoe, here, and it was Robert Louis Stevenson’s inspiration for the Admiral Benbow in Treasure Island. In the Victorian era the pub was associated with the Theatre Royal, which is across the road, and was visited by many performers and musicians including Henry Irving.

Name
Trows historically sailed to trade in Bristol from Llandogo. The pub was named by Captain Hawkins, a sailor who lived in Llandogo and ran the pub.

Modern usage
In 1962 it became a Berni Inn, but now belongs to Whitbread and traded as a Brewers Fayre. In 2007, The Llandoger Trow was one of the three locations seen in the "Pirate's Cove" episode of Most Haunted Live! The others were Blackbeard's houses and Redcliffe Caves. The most popular ghost story associated with the pub is that of a small child who wore leg braces and haunts the top floor, their footsteps heard at night. The programme claimed that there were at least 15 ghosts at the Llandoger Trow, and since 2009 the owners have organised ghost hunts overnight.

In 2019 Whitbread decided to close the Llandoger Trow as it did not fit Whitbread's style of pubs, and it needed repairs at an estimated cost exceeding £2 million. It closed on 20 April 2019. Whitbread intend to lease out the building as a going concern.

References

Buildings and structures completed in 1664
Grade II* listed pubs in Bristol
1664 establishments in England
Daniel Defoe
Robert Louis Stevenson